Což takhle dát si špenát  is a 1977 Czechoslovak comedy science fiction film directed by Václav Vorlíček.

Summary 
Two swindlers get to prison for alcohol theft. After an exit from prison they are employed in a lab inventing a device for regeneration of old cows. The owner of salon wants to use devices for rejuvenation. But something goes wrong, and they end up rejuvenated to kids.

Cast
 Vladimír Menšík - Zemánek
 Jiří Sovák - Liška
 Iva Janžurová - Lišková / Marcelka (big)
 Michal Kocourek - Zemánek (boy)
 Ondřej Hach - Liška (boy)
 František Filipovský - Grandfather Liška
 Ivana Maříková - Lenka
 Petr Přívozník - Mirek
 Stella Zázvorková - Lopezová
 Josef Somr - Pereira
 Eva Trejtnarová - Mária
 Petr Kostka - Carlos
 Jaroslava Obermaierová - Vilma
 Bedřich Prokoš - Professor
 Čestmír Řanda - Mlejnek
 Juraj Herz - Netušil

External links
 

1970s science fiction comedy films
1977 films
Czechoslovak science fiction comedy films
Films directed by Václav Vorlíček
Czech science fiction comedy films
Films about rapid human age change
1977 comedy films
1970s Czech films